The 1936 Lebanese presidential election was the first presidential election, which was held during a parliamentary session on 20 January 1936. The Nationalist Émile Eddé defeated the Constitutional Bechara El Khoury. He took office as the third president of Greater Lebanon and the first elected one.

The President is elected by the Members of Parliament. He needs a two-thirds majority to win in the first round, while an absolute majority is enough in the second round.

All 25 Members of the Parliament attended the session, including Eddé and El Khoury, and voted in two rounds. Eddé won the first one with 14 votes against 11 for El Khoury. In the second round however, 15 deputies elected Eddé, which was enough for him to become the next President.

References 

Elections in Lebanon
Lebanon
January 1936 events
1936 in Lebanon